Ivy Paul "Poison" Andrews (May 6, 1907 – November 24, 1970) was an American Major League Baseball pitcher with the New York Yankees, Boston Red Sox, St. Louis Browns and the Cleveland Indians between 1931 and 1938. Andrews batted and threw right-handed. He was born in Dora, Alabama.

Andrews was bothered by arm ailments much of his career. He spent eight seasons in the American League with the Yankees, Red Sox, Browns and Indians, being used as both a starter and long reliever. His most productive season came in 1935 for the seventh-place Browns, when he had a 13–7 record and a 3.54 ERA (eighth in the league). In a second stint for the Yankees, he pitched  innings of relief in Game Four of the 1937 World Series.

In 249 appearances (108 as a starter), Andrew posted a 50–59 record with 257 strikeouts and a 4.14 ERA in 1041 innings.

Andrews returned to Alabama in 1945 to become the Birmingham Barons' first pitching coach. He managed the team briefly during the 1947 season, and retired from baseball a year later. Andrews died in Birmingham, Alabama, at the age of 63. He was inducted into the Alabama Sports Hall of Fame in 1985.

In the latter part of his career, Andrews added a knuckleball and screwball to a pitch repertoire that consisted of a "blazing fastball", a curveball and a changeup.

References

External links

Baseball Almanac
Ivy Andrews Biography at Baseball Biography

1907 births
1970 deaths
Albany Senators players
Baseball coaches from Alabama
Baseball players from Alabama
Birmingham Barons managers
Birmingham Barons players
Boston Red Sox players
Cleveland Indians players
Greenville Spinners players
Hollywood Stars players
Jersey City Skeeters players
Kansas City Blues (baseball) players
Knoxville Smokies players
Knuckleball pitchers
Major League Baseball pitchers
Mobile Bears players
Montgomery Rebels players
Newark Bears (IL) players
New York Yankees players
Oakland Oaks (baseball) players
People from Walker County, Alabama
Reading Keystones players
St. Louis Browns players
Screwball pitchers
Selma Selmians players
Waterloo Hawks (baseball) players